Benji Oldai Villalobos Segovia (born 15 July 1988 in  El Salvador) is a Salvadoran professional goalkeeper.

Club career

UDET 
After starting his career at UDET in 2004.

Universidad Gerardo Barrios 
Villalobos played for Segunda División club Universidad Gerardo Barrios in 2005, before joining Águila in 2006.

Águila 
Although Villalobos had been signed to Águila since 2006, he did not get any game time until 2 May 2008, in a league match against Alianza. Although Águila lost that game 2–1, Villalobos did very well and proved that he had a lot of potential.

On 15 September 2012, he scored a penalty kick against Isidro Metapán in a 2–3 defeat.

On 22 December 2009, Águila reached the Apertura 2009 final against FAS, but lost 2–3, Villalobos did not play.

In the next tournament, Águila will achieved a new final, but lost against Isidro Metapán 1–3, Villalobos did not play.

On 6 May 2012, Águila won the Clausura 2012 final against Isidro Metapán (2–1 victory), Villalobos was in goal.

Águila reached the semi-finals of the Apertura 2012, but lost against Isidro Metapán 3–5 on aggregate.

Águila was two points away from relegation in the Clausura 2014.

In the next tournament reached a new final, but lost against Isidro Metapán on penalties, Villalobos was in goal.

Águila reached the Clausura 2016 final, but lost again local rivals Dragón 0–1, Villalobos was in goal.

On 1 December 2018, Águila reached the semi-finals of the Apertura 2018, after defeating Audaz 4–3 on aggregate. However, Águila was eliminated by Santa Tecla F.C. 2–5 on aggregate. In May 2019, Villalobos save two penalties at the Clausura 2019 final against Alianza F.C.

Match-fixing ban
On 10 October 2013, Villalobos was banned for six months due to his involvement with match fixing.

International career
Villalobos received his first call-up to the El Salvador national team for the 2010 FIFA World Cup qualification game against Suriname on 10 September 2008, but did not get any game time. He has since been selected numerous times, but only received his first full men's national team cap when he played in an international friendly against Guatemala in September 2010, which El Salvador lost two-nil.

He was a non-playing squad member at the 2009 CONCACAF Gold Cup. However, Villalobos returned to El Salvador national team in 2017.

Honours

Player

Club
C.D. Águila
 Primera División
 Champion: Clausura 2012, Clausura 2019
 Runners-up: Apertura 2009, Clausura 2010, Apertura 2014, Clausura 2016

References

External links
 

1988 births
Living people
People from San Miguel Department (El Salvador)
Association football goalkeepers
Salvadoran footballers
El Salvador international footballers
2009 CONCACAF Gold Cup players
2013 CONCACAF Gold Cup players
2017 Copa Centroamericana players
2017 CONCACAF Gold Cup players
C.D. Águila footballers
Sportspeople involved in betting scandals